Frome is a single-member electoral district for the South Australian House of Assembly. It is named after Edward Charles Frome, the third surveyor-general of South Australia. The electorate stretches north-eastwards from the Gawler River and Gulf St Vincent in the south, and includes many of the agricultural areas of the Clare and Gilbert Valleys. Prior to the 2020 redistribution, its main population centre was Port Pirie, since transferred to the Stuart.

Frome has existed in three incarnations throughout the history of the House of Assembly: as a two-seat multi-member marginal electorate from 1884 to 1902, as a single-member electorate from 1938 to 1977, and as a marginal to moderately safe single-member electorate for the Liberal Party since 1993.

The electoral districts of Pirie and Port Pirie have also historically existed.

The first incarnation of Frome was, like the rest of the state, independent-held until the development of the party system in the 1890s. The two seats were split evenly with a conservative and a liberal member from 1890 until the seat's abolition in 1902.

The second incarnation began in 1938 after the introduction of the Playmander.  It was based on the area north of Port Pirie, and was originally a Labor stronghold. The seat was won by Mick O'Halloran, who held it until his death in 1960, serving as Opposition Leader from 1949 to 1960. After the Playmander was significantly diluted by the 1970 electoral reforms, Frome was moved into more conservative-leaning rural areas around Port Pirie, turning it into a notional Liberal and Country League (LCL) seat.  O'Halloran's successor, Tom Casey, believed this made Frome impossible to hold and successfully transferred to the Legislative Council.  The LCL, which later became the South Australia division of the Liberal Party, won the seat at the 1970 state election, and went on to hold Frome until the abolition of the seat in 1977.

The third and current incarnation was created at the 1991 redistribution as a marginal Liberal seat based on Port Pirie. The seat was first contested at the 1993 election.  Despite the presence of Port Pirie, a Labor stronghold for more than a century, Labor has never won this incarnation due to the heavy Liberal tilt of the surrounding rural area. Labor did however win 50.1 percent of the two-party vote at the 2010 election, but the seat was retained by incumbent independent Geoff Brock.

Rob Kerin became the elected member in the Liberal landslide of 1993. He went on to become Premier of South Australia in 2001, and Leader of the Opposition from 2002 to 2005 after the Liberals narrowly lost the 2002 state election.  Kerin chose to retire in November 2008, which triggered the January 2009 by-election. The by-election was won by independent Geoff Brock, the popular mayor of the Port Pirie Regional Council, after a very close contest with the Labor candidate for second place behind the Liberal candidate. Brock received sufficient preferences from the eliminated Labor candidate to prevail over the Liberal candidate by over 600 votes, receiving 51.7 percent of the two-candidate vote. He increased his primary and two-candidate vote significantly at the 2010 election; Labor won 50.1 percent of the "traditional" Labor/Liberal two-party preferred vote at this election.

With the 2012 redistribution, the Labor/Liberal two-party-preferred margin in Frome went from 0.1 percent Labor to 1.7 percent Liberal. Brock retained the electorate at the 2014 election with a slight increase to his margin, while the Liberals won 60.8 percent of the "traditional" two-party preferred vote.  His decision to back the Labor minority government allowed Labor to win a record fourth consecutive four-year term in government.

Brock retained the electorate at the 2018 election. A redistribution in 2020 transferred the regional city of Port Pirie, where Brock was based in, from  Frome to the electorate of Stuart. Brock transferred to Stuart at the 2022 state election and Frome was regained by the Liberal Party in the election.

Members for Frome

Election results

Notes

References
 ECSA profile for Frome: 2018
 ABC profile for Frome: 2018
 Poll Bludger profile for Frome: 2018

Electoral districts of South Australia
1884 establishments in Australia
1902 disestablishments in Australia
1938 establishments in Australia
1977 disestablishments in Australia
1993 establishments in Australia